Vanessa Kara González (born 27 November 1996) is a professional footballer who plays as a forward. Born in the United States, she represents the Dominican Republic women's national team.

Early life
Born in Burlington, New Jersey to a Dominican mother, Kara began playing soccer at the Bridle Club in her hometown, playing alongside her brothers. She soon joined the PDA Fusion, part of the Players Development Academy. During her club and her high school career at Moorestown Friends School, Kara suffered two ACL tears in both knees. During her senior year of high school, Kara committed to playing for the Drexel Dragons of Drexel University.

During her first season with Drexel Dragons, she recorded a team record 11 goals in 18 matches, and was named the 2015 CAA Rookie of the Year. In her sophomore year, Kara scored 6 goals and contributed 5 assists as she earned All-CAA First Team honors. During her final season with the Dragons, she scored 5 goals. Prior to the 2017 playoffs, Kara tore her ACL again and had to red shirt during what would have been her senior year.

In 2019, Kara left Drexel University, and joined the Florida Gators of the University of Florida. One of her former coached had recommended Kara to Gators head coach Becky Burleigh. During her only season with the Florida Gators, Kara scored a team leading 10 goals, tied for 5th in the Southeastern Conference.

Club career
On 16 January 2020, Kara was eligible for selection in the NWSL College Draft but was not selected. The day after the draft, Kara received a call from North Carolina Courage head coach Paul Riley to join the team for preseason. Later that year, Kara joined Kansallinen Liiga club TiPS. She made her debut for the side on 22 August 2020 against Åland United, starting in a 3–0 defeat. Kara then scored her first goal on 5 September against PK-35, scoring the only goal in a 1–0 victory.

Racing Louisville
On 5 April 2021, after training with them during preseason, Kara returned to the United States and joined National Women's Soccer League club Racing Louisville. She made her professional debut for the club on 15 April 2021 in the NWSL Challenge Cup against the Washington Spirit, coming on as an 89th-minute substitute in a 1–0 defeat.

International career
Kara made her senior debut for the Dominican Republic on 22 October 2021, starting in a 3–0 friendly home win over Bolivia. During the match, she scored a brace and assisted the remaining goal.

Career statistics

Honours
Individual
 2015 CAA Rookie of the Year

References

External links
 Profile at Racing Louisville
 

1996 births
Living people
Citizens of the Dominican Republic through descent
Dominican Republic women's footballers
Women's association football forwards
Kansallinen Liiga players
Dominican Republic women's international footballers
Dominican Republic expatriate women's footballers
Dominican Republic expatriate sportspeople in Finland
Expatriate women's footballers in Finland
People from Burlington, New Jersey
Sportspeople from Burlington County, New Jersey
Soccer players from New Jersey
American women's soccer players
Moorestown Friends School alumni
Drexel Dragons women's soccer players
Florida Gators women's soccer players
Racing Louisville FC players
National Women's Soccer League players
American expatriate women's soccer players
American expatriate sportspeople in Finland
American sportspeople of Dominican Republic descent